Shanghai Astronomical Observatory (SHAO), is an astronomical observatory in Shanghai. It has a long history of astrometry, and also operates the   Sheshan radio telescope as part of the Chinese VLBI array and the European VLBI Network (EVN). It was formed in 1962 from the merger of the Xujiahui (also romanized as "Ziikawei") and Sheshan (Zose) observatories in Shanghai. It was involved with the Chang'e 1 moon mission as the VLBI array is used for position determinations.

History
In October 2012 the Tian Ma   radio telescope was completed for SHAO. It is part of the Chinese Academy of Sciences.

List of directors
 Li Heng (1962 − Cultural Revolution)
 Ye Shuhua (1978−1979)
 Li Heng (1979–1981)
 Ye Shuhua (1981−1993)
 Zhao Junliang (1993−2003)
 Liao Xinhao (2003−2005, as executive vice director)
 Hong Xiaoyu (2005−2017, as executive vice director until 2007)
 Shen Zhiqiang (沈志强; 2017–present)

See also 
 Sheshan Observatory
 List of astronomical observatories

Notes and references

Astronomical observatories in China
Buildings and structures in Shanghai
Research institutes of the Chinese Academy of Sciences
Astrometry
1962 establishments in China
Education in Shanghai